El Yeyo may refer to:

Aurelio Cano Flores (b. 1972), Mexican drug lord
Edelio López Falcón (1965–2003), Mexican drug lord